Badges of the United States Coast Guard are issued by the Department of Homeland Security to members of the United States Coast Guard to denote certain qualifications, achievements, and postings to certain assignments.  Prior to 2002, the issuance of such badges was under the authority of the United States Department of Transportation.

In addition to the U.S. Coast Guard badges listed below, uniform regulations also authorize the wear of some specific U.S. Navy insignia as well as some Department of Defense and Executive Branch Identification badges.

The following are the current U.S. Coast Guard and U.S. Coast Guard Auxiliary badges authorized for wear on the Coast Guard uniform:

Aviation

Qualification Insignia

Diving BadgesCommand Identification Badges

Service Identification Badges

Marksmanship Competition Badges

See also

Military badges of the United States
Identification badges of the United States military
Obsolete badges of the United States military
List of United States Coast Guard ratings

References

 
United States military badges